NRP Vouga was one of five  built for the Portuguese Navy during the 1930s. She remained in service until the early 1960s.

Design and description
 
The Douros were powered by two Parsons-Curtis geared steam turbines, each driving one propeller shaft using steam provided by three Yarrow boilers.

Armament was similar to contemporary Royal Navy destroyers, with a gun armament of four 4.7 in (120 mm) Vickers-Armstrong Mk G guns, and three 2-pounder Mk VIII anti-aircraft guns. Two quadruple banks of 21-inch (533 mm) torpedo tubes were carried, while two depth charge throwers and 12 depth charges constituted the ships' anti-submarine armament. Up to 20 mines could be carried. The ships' complement consisted of 147 officers and men.

Construction and career
The five destroyers carried out patrols to defend Portugal's neutrality during the Second World War. Their anti-aircraft armament was revised during 1942–1943, with the 40 mm guns and one of the banks of torpedo tubes replaced by six 20 mm cannon. The ships were refitted by Yarrow from 1946 to 1949, with the machinery refurbished, anti-aircraft armament again revised to three Bofors 40 mm gun in powered mounts and three 20 mm cannon. Sonar and British Type 285 and Type 291 radars were fitted.

Notes

Citations

Sources

 
 

 

 
1933 ships
Ships built in Glasgow